Calvin is an unincorporated community in Lee County, Virginia, in the United States.

History
A post office was established at Calvin in 1924, and remained in operation until it was discontinued in 1955. The community was named for Calvin Pardee, a mining official.

References

Unincorporated communities in Lee County, Virginia
Unincorporated communities in Virginia